The BRP Datu Sanday (MMOV-3002) (also known as DA-BFAR MMOV-3002) is the second ship of the Datu Cabaylo-class of 30-meter multi-mission offshore civilian patrol vessels being built for the Philippine government's Bureau of Fisheries and Aquatic Resources. The ship is being built by Josefa Slipways, Inc. in Sual, Pangasinan and is scheduled to be launched 3rd quarter of 2022. Its intended mission is to guard Philippine waters against illegal fishing.

References 

2022 ships
Ships of the Bureau of Fisheries and Aquatic Resources